Combpyne railway station was the intermediate station on the Lyme Regis branch line in East Devon, England. Serving the village of Combpyne, it was sited high on the sharp bend that changed the course of the line from south to an easterly direction.

History
Opened on 24 August 1903 by the Axminster and Lyme Regis Railway, which was authorised under the Light Railways Act 1896, it was operated from the start by the London and South Western Railway then by the Southern Railway. The line then passed on to the Southern Region of British Railways on nationalisation in 1948. A camping coach was positioned here by the Southern Region from 1954 to 1963. The line was transferred to the Western Region of British Railways in January 1963. It was then closed by the British Railways Board on 29 November 1965.

Buildings
A station consisted of a single short platform with a station house on a nearby road.

The site today
The former station house still exists.

References

Further reading

External links 
 Compyne station on navigable 1946 O. S. map
Combpyne station on Sub Brit

Disused railway stations in Devon
Former London and South Western Railway stations
Railway stations in Great Britain opened in 1903
Railway stations in Great Britain closed in 1965
Beeching closures in England